Henry Kanonta Buchanan (born August 5, 1978) is an American professional boxer.

Professional career
Known as "Sugar Poo", Buchanan began his professional career in 2004, and was undefeated heading into a ShoBox Super Middleweight eliminator tournament, and lost to Jean Paul Mendy.

The Contender
He was the featured boxers on the 3rd season of the boxing reality TV series, The Contender, The Contender (season 3), premiering September 4, 2007 on ESPN.

Episode that aired on September 11, 2007 said that for personal reasons, he would not participate in season 3 of The Contender.  Buchanan later revealed that it was a business and financial decision, as his promoter did not want to surrender Buchanan's promotional rights to ESPN .

Notes
He is the uncle of San Diego Chargers linebacker Shawne Merriman.

Professional boxing record

External links
 

1978 births
Boxers from Maryland
Living people
People from Capitol Heights, Maryland
American male boxers
Light-heavyweight boxers